Cédric Mouret (born 26 March 1978 in Avignon, France) is a French former professional footballer who played as a striker. He made ten appearances for the France U21 national team.

References

External links
 
 
 

1978 births
Living people
Sportspeople from Avignon
Association football forwards
French footballers
France under-21 international footballers
AS Cannes players
Ligue 1 players
Olympique de Marseille players
AS Nancy Lorraine players
Ligue 2 players
FC Istres players
FC Martigues players
AC Avignonnais players
France youth international footballers